Bernard Joseph Leddy (March 18, 1910 – January 9, 1972) was a United States district judge of the United States District Court for the District of Vermont.

Education and career
Leddy was born in Underhill, Vermont on March 18, 1910, a son of John T. Leddy and Anna (Marlow) Leddy. Leddy was educated in the parochial schools of Underhill and Burlington, and was a 1927 graduate of Burlington's Cathedral High School. He received his Artium Baccalaureus degree from Saint Michael's College in 1931, and his Bachelor of Laws from Boston College Law School in 1934. He was a Burlington alderman from 1935 to 1940. He was an Assistant United States Attorney for Vermont from 1940 to 1954.

In 1946, Leddy was named chair of the Burlington Zoning Commission. In 1955, he was elected chair of the Saint Michael's College board of trustees. In 1956, he was elected chair of the Chittenden County Bar Association. Leddy was a civilian aide for the United States Secretary of the Army from 1962 to 1966.

Gubernatorial campaign
Leddy was the 1958 Democratic nominee for Governor of Vermont. At a time when Vermont was overwhelmingly Republican, Leddy lost to Robert Stafford by only 719 votes (50.3% to 49.7%). Leddy's strong showing in the governor's race, coupled with the win of Democrat William H. Meyer in the election for Vermont's at-large seat in the United States House of Representatives, was an indicator that the state's Democrats were growing in strength after more than 100 years of Republican dominance in statewide elections.

Federal judicial service
Leddy was nominated by President Lyndon B. Johnson on August 16, 1966, to the United States District Court for the District of Vermont, to a new seat created by 80 Stat. 75. He was confirmed by the United States Senate on August 25, 1966, and received his commission the same day. He served as Chief Judge from 1969 to 1972. His service was terminated on January 9, 1972, due to his death after suffering a heart attack at his Burlington home. He is buried at Resurrection Park Cemetery in South Burlington.

Family
In 1939, Leddy married Johannah (Mahoney) Leddy. They were the parents of sons John T. and the Reverend James P., and three daughters, Ann, Johannah, and Mary. Johannah was the wife of Thomas Donovan. Ann is the wife of Alan Charron.

Leddy's son James P. Leddy was a member of the Vermont State Senate. His daughter Johannah Leddy Donovan has served in the Vermont House of Representatives since 2001. His grandson T. J. Donovan was the State's Attorney for Chittenden County, Vermont, prior to winning election as Vermont Attorney General in 2016.

Honor
A park in Burlington is named in Leddy's honor.

References

Sources
 
 

1910 births
1972 deaths
Saint Michael's College alumni
Boston College Law School alumni
Vermont Democrats
Vermont lawyers
Vermont city council members
Judges of the United States District Court for the District of Vermont
United States district court judges appointed by Lyndon B. Johnson
20th-century American judges
People from Underhill, Vermont
Burials in Vermont
20th-century American lawyers
Assistant United States Attorneys